Cantharocybe is a genus of mushroom-forming fungi in the family Hygrophoraceae. The genus was described by American mycologists Howard E. Bigelow and Alexander H. Smith in 1973. Cantharocybe contains three species: the type C. gruberi, and C. brunneovelutina from Belize, reported as new to science in 2011, and C. virosa, transferred from "Megacollybia", and found in Bangladesh and India.

See also
List of Agaricales genera

References

Agaricales genera
Hygrophoraceae
Taxa named by Alexander H. Smith